William Bradshaw VC (12 February 1830 – 9 March 1861), born in Thurles, County Tipperary, was an Irish recipient of the Victoria Cross, the highest and most prestigious award for valour in the face of the enemy that can be awarded to British and Commonwealth forces.

Details
He served during the Crimean War in the 50th Regiment of Foot transferring to the 90th Regiment of Foot.

Bradshaw was 27 years old, and an assistant surgeon in the 90th Regiment (later known as The Cameronians (Scottish Rifles)), British Army during the Indian Mutiny when the following deed took place on 26 September 1857 at Lucknow, India, for which he was awarded the VC:

Later life
William Bradshaw died on 9 March 1861 and is buried at St Mary's Church graveyard, Thurles. Memorial is in the church. His Victoria Cross is displayed at the Army Medical Services Museum (Aldershot, Hampshire England).

See also
Anthony Dickson Home

References

Listed in order of publication year
The Register of the Victoria Cross (1981, 1988 and 1997)

Ireland's VCs (Dept of Economic Development, 1995)
 Monuments to Courage (David Harvey, 1999)
 Irish Winners of the Victoria Cross (Richard Doherty & David Truesdale, 2000)

External links
 Location of grave and VC medal (Co. Tipperary, Ireland)
 Assistant Surgeon W. Bradshaw
 

Irish recipients of the Victoria Cross
Indian Rebellion of 1857 recipients of the Victoria Cross
British Army regimental surgeons
British Army personnel of the Crimean War
Cameronians officers
Queen's Own Royal West Kent Regiment officers
32nd Regiment of Foot officers
People from Thurles
1830 births
1861 deaths
19th-century Irish people
Irish soldiers in the British Army
British Army recipients of the Victoria Cross
Military personnel from County Tipperary